Jasper Dahlhaus (born 27 November 2001) is a Dutch footballer who plays as a forward for Eindhoven.

Club career
On 1 February 2021, he joined Eindhoven on loan until the end of the season. On 16 July 2021, he returned to Eindhoven on a permanent basis and signed a two-year contract.

Career statistics

Club

Notes

References

External links
 Career stats & Profile - Voetbal International

2001 births
Living people
Dutch footballers
Netherlands youth international footballers
Association football forwards
SBV Vitesse players
Willem II (football club) players
FC Eindhoven players
Tweede Divisie players
Eredivisie players
Eerste Divisie players
Footballers from Gelderland
People from Doetinchem